Meet the Family may refer to:
 Meet the Family (album) (1997), Frenzal Rhomb's third studio album
 Meet the Family (TV series) (2013), Canadian hidden camera television series